Çıraqqala Siyəzən FK was an Azerbaijani football club from Siyəzən founded in 1991. They played in the Azerbaijan Top Division for only one season, 1992, before relegation to the Azerbaijan First Division. They dissolved two years later at the end of the 1993–94 season.

League and domestic cup history

References 

Ciraqqala Siyezen
Association football clubs established in 1991
Defunct football clubs in Azerbaijan
Association football clubs disestablished in 1994
1991 establishments in Azerbaijan